The Herr's Snacks 200 is an Automobile Racing Club of America (ARCA) race at Salem Speedway, currently held in the fall. ARCA first held a race at Salem in 1979 before returning from 1987 to 1989. Races have been consistently held in the fall since 1992 and in April from 1996 to 2019. The April 2020 race was cancelled due to COVID-19, and only the fall race remained on the schedule in subsequent years. Frank Kimmel is the only multi-time winner of the April event, taking four victories. He also won the fall event five times, totaling nine wins at the track. Tim Steele was victorious four times at the track, including winning the fall event three times. Tom Hessert III and Bob Strait are also multi-time winners of the fall event.

Past events

1993, 19972, 19981, 19991,2, 20001,2, 20032, 20042, 20052, 20081, 20111, 20131, 20141: Race extended due to a green–white–checker finish.
20012, 20191: Race shortened due to rain.

Multiple winners (drivers)

Manufacturer wins

References

External links
 Official ARCA Website
 Racing-Reference.info – Salem Speedway (IN)

ARCA Menards Series races
ARCA Menards Series
Motorsport in Indiana
Sports competitions in Indiana